Armutdüzü is a village in Yüksekova District in Hakkâri Province in Turkey. The village is populated by Kurds of the Pinyanişî tribe and had a population of 428 in 2022.

The ten hamlets of Aktoprak, Arpalı,  Damlacık, Erdal, Erikli, Korunak, Şahince,  Yağmurlu and Yuvalı are all attached to Armutdüzü.

Population 
Population history of the village from 2000 to 2022:

References 

Villages in Yüksekova District
Kurdish settlements in Hakkâri Province